Richard Hennahane (born 2 January 1981) is a British Paralympic archer from Great Sutton, Cheshire, originally from Kent.

He competed in the 2012 Summer Paralympics in London, being knocked out of the men's compound in the last 16.

References

Paralympic archers of Great Britain
Archers at the 2012 Summer Paralympics
Living people
English male archers
1981 births